The FIFAe World Cup, formerly the FIFA Interactive World Cup (FIWC) and the FIFA eWorld Cup, is an esports tournament held by FIFA and its presenting partner EA Sports. Each tournament has players competing in games of the latest incarnation of the FIFA association football video game series. The open qualifying format allows millions to compete in the initial online stages, which has resulted in the FIWC being recognized as the largest online esports game by Guinness World Records.

The most recent champion is Umut Gültekin from Germany.

History

The inaugural FIWC took place in 2004 in Switzerland, over the years the tournament has grown significantly. In 2010, the FIWC first appeared in the Guinness World Records – but it was not until 2013 that the competition saw the current record of more than 2.5 million players signing up.

On 1 October 2015, the FIWC 16 kicked off, marking the 12th edition of the tournament. For the first time in the history of the competition Xbox One and PlayStation 4 players competed against each other. With the integration of the new consoles the number of participants increased significantly, compared to previous years when the FIWC was only available on PlayStation 3. 2.3 million players attempted to qualify for the Grand Final in New York City. On 22 March 2016, Mohamad Al-Bacha from Denmark won the FIWC title in the Apollo Theater, beating Sean Allen from England in the final match.

In 2018, the FIFA Interactive World Cup (FIWC) was renamed to the FIFA eWorld Cup (FeWC).  The 2018 Grand Finals was held between 2 August 2018 through 4 August 2018 in the O2 Arena in London, England.  32 finalists (16 on PlayStation 4 and 16 on Xbox One) competed in the group stage and round of 16 on 2 August 2018, with the second leg of the round of 16 and the quarterfinals taking place on 3 August 2018.  The semi-finals and final took place on 4 August 2018.

In October 2020, the FIFA eWorld Cup was rebranded as the FIFAe World Cup as part of FIFA's launch of its FIFAe esports tournament series.

Results

Format

Online qualification
The FeWC online qualification takes place on PlayStation and Xbox Networks, and can be accessed through the latest version of EA Sports FIFA on Xbox One and PS4. The players qualify via the console playoffs where the top 16 players make it through to the eWorld Cup finals.  Players can also qualify for the FeWC by competing in one of the FIFA Global Series tournaments throughout the season, with the top 16 at the last event automatically qualifying for the FeWC.

In the 2022 edition, games are only played on PlayStation 5 console. 128 players are selected for the FIFA Global Series Playoffs including 74 qualified via Regional Global Series Ranking and 54 qualified via Partner Leagues.

Grand Finals
32 players compete at the Grand Finals of the FeWC. The participants are divided into four groups (two for each console) with the top 16 players moving on to the knockout stage. While Group stage, Round of 16, Quarter-finals and Semi-finals are played on one console (Xbox One or PS4), the Final is a two-leg match with one game on each console. The Grand Final is a multi-day event with draw and competition being broken up into three days. The winner is crowned in a live show at the end of the event.

In the 2022 edition, games are only played on PlayStation 5 console. Before the 2022 edition, matches in Group Stage are two-leg match in a single round robin format; it was changed into single game double round robin from 2022 on.

World ranking
In 2016, the FIFA Interactive World Cup World Ranking was introduced to help seed the players in the tournament according to their previous results. The ranking takes into account both the qualification phase for the current edition and previous FeWC Grand Finals.

Prize fund

The FeWC 2018 champion received $250,000 in prize money and a ticket to the Best FIFA Awards where he has the chance to meet the greatest of the real football world. FIWC 2015 Champion Abdulaziz Alshehri from Saudi Arabia was able to meet Cristiano Ronaldo and Lionel Messi among many others, while 2016 champion Mohammad Al-Bacha talked to Marcelo Vieira and Manuel Neuer.

The runner-up of the 2018 FeWC Grand Final receives $50,000 in prize money.

Broadcast
The FeWC Grand Finals is streamed live on YouTube and Twitch. For the first time, the Final Showdown of the FIWC16 was also broadcast on TV. The broadcast was shown in more than 100 countries around the world. Fox Sports 1 showed the Final live in the United States. 
The show was moderated by host Kay Murray. Former US footballer Alexi Lalas and Spencer Carmichael-Brown (Spencer FC) analyzed the matches, Leigh Smith and John Strong commentated the games. The trophy was handed over by former Spanish International David Villa.

See also
FIFAe Nations Cup
FIFAe Club World Cup

References

External links
, FIFA.com 

FIFA (video game series) competitions
FIFA